George James Furness  (1868 – 1936), was an engineer and scouter, and the member of parliament for the constituency of Willesden West on behalf of the Unionist Party from 1922–1923.

Scouting 
In the Boy Scout Association, Furness was the second district commissioner of Willesden district. He took over from captain C. Pearse in November 1915, only 6 months after the association was founded, presumably as Pearse was called away to war. Furness continued as district commissioner until his death in 1936.

Legacy 
When he died he left an estate valued at £278,312 2s 5d to his wife Mary Mable.

He died during his term as High Sheriff of Middlesex and his son, George James Barnard Furness, was given the position in 1939.

References

High Sheriffs of Middlesex
1868 births
1936 deaths
Conservative Party (UK) MPs for English constituencies
UK MPs 1922–1923